Great Mill or Ride's Mill is a Grade II listed smock mill just off the High Street in Sheerness,  Kent, England, that was demolished in 1924, leaving the brick base standing. It now has a new smock tower built on it as residential accommodation.

History

Work on building the Great mill was started by the millwright Humphrey of Cranbrook in 1813. Owing to the nature of the ground the mill was built on it was necessary to lay deep foundations. Lack of funds meant that the mill was left as an unfinished base for a couple of years before Thomas Webb, who owned the Little Mill, bought the unfinished mill and financed its completion in 1816. A steam engine was added in 1889 as auxiliary power. The mill was worked by wind until 1905, when the sails and stage were removed. It worked by steam engine until 1918, and was demolished in 1924. The mill's brick base was left, serving as a corn store in the 1930s.

In 2006, planning permission was applied for, and granted, to convert the existing mill base into a flat, with a new smock tower built on the base containing another flat, and an extension containing a third flat. Construction started late in 2006. The replica windmill will have a stage and dummy sails. The cap was lifted onto the mill tower late in 2007. On 23 January 2008 a fire started in the mill tower. The fire was later declared not to have been a case of arson.

Description

Great Mill was a four-storey smock mill on a two-storey brick base, with a Kentish-style cap carrying four patent sails. It was winded by hand, no fantail being fitted. There was a stage at second-floor level. The mill drove three pairs of millstones, and the steam engine drove a further two pairs, as well as the millstones in the windmill. The replica has a smock built on a steel frame, with a Kentish-style cap.

Millers

Thomas Webb 1816 – 1864
G Ride & Son 1864 – 1918

References for above:-

References

External links
Windmill World page on the mill.

Windmills in Kent
Grinding mills in the United Kingdom
Smock mills in England
Grade II listed buildings in Kent
Windmills completed in 1816
Demolished buildings and structures in Kent
Sheerness
Octagonal buildings in the United Kingdom
Buildings and structures completed in 2008
1816 establishments in England